Roženberk (in older sources also Rosenberg) is a small settlement north of Dolenje Jesenice in the Municipality of Šentrupert in southeastern Slovenia. The area is part of the historical region of Lower Carniola. The municipality is now included in the Southeast Slovenia Statistical Region.

References

External links
Roženberk at Geopedia

Populated places in the Municipality of Šentrupert